Woodlands House School is a school in Srinagar, the summer capital of Jammu and Kashmir, India. Pupils range from pre-nursery stage to 12th grade. The school consists of a boys' wing and a girls' wing separately.

History
Woodlands House School was established by Mrs Rup SP Singh (founder and principal) in 1966 under the foothills of the Takht-e-Sulaiman/Shankaracharya Temple. The school started with few students but her leadership attracted the people of J&K in general and that of Srinagar in particular. The institution began to progress and enrolment soon increased. Her work was recognized by the then Chief Minister, Bakshi Gulam Mohammad and later on by Sheikh Mohammed Abdullah who encouraged her to start her junior wing at Shivpora, Srinagar which later was converted to the girls' wing. Woodlands House School met a need as there were only a few English-medium schools in the area. The school progressed in academic, co-curricular and infrastructural aspects. 

Mrs Singh placed emphasis on inculcating social and moral values. She left her post in 1995 and was succeeded by her son, Mr Riki Singh, the chairman and principal of the school.

Notable alumni
Mir Sarwar

Location
The boys' wing is located at Gupkar Road, Sonwar Bagh, Srinagar. The girls' wing is located at Shivpora, Srinagar.

References

1966 establishments in Jammu and Kashmir
Educational institutions established in 1966
Schools in Srinagar

Girls' schools in Jammu and Kashmir